Ellerman's tufted-tailed rat (Eliurus ellermani) is a species of rodent in the family Nesomyidae. It is endemic to eastern Madagascar. As only two specimens of this species have been observed, questions have been raised regarding whether this taxon is distinct from Eliurus tanala.

References

Mammals of Madagascar
Eliurus
Mammals described in 1994
Taxa named by Michael D. Carleton